Harry David Kerr (8 October 1880 Santa Rosa, California – 21 May 1957 Los Angeles) was an American songwriter, lyricist, author, and lawyer.  Kerr became active in music at age 15 (1895).  The practice of law had been his prime avocation until 1920, when he decided to focus on songwriting. But he still continued to use his legal training in music.  In 1922, while living in New York City, Kerr prepared the incorporation documents for the American Society of Composers, Authors and Publishers (ASCAP), of which he had become one of 90 charter members at its founding in 1914.

Copyright activist 
From February 1900 to 1903, he had studied law in the law office of George H. Cobb of Watertown, New York.  In May 1905, Kerr received an LL.B. from Albany Law School.

Beginning in 1907 as a young lawyer, Kerr worked for about 18 months with a coalition in Washington, D.C., for the passage of the Copyright Act of 1909, which secured the rights of composers to charge royalties on the sales of sound recordings.  While lobbying for it, Kerr was associated with the New York City law firm Dougherty, Olcott & Tenney.

The U.S. Congregational Committee on Copyrights began hearings Mary 26–28, 1908, at the Library of Congress, to vet the concerns and proposals of authors and managers.  Constituent groups giving testimony were the (i) National Association of Theatrical Managers, (ii) the Allied Copyright Committee, and (iii) the White Rats, an author advocacy group of which Kerr was a member.

In 1909, Kerr also wrote the lyrics to "Get on a Raft With Taft," President William H. Taft's campaign song — a particularly memorable concept given that Taft weighed 300 lbs.  Taft signed the Copyright Act into law.

Growing up 
Kerr attended Gouverneur High School, Gouverneur, New York, during the 1899–1900 school-year.  He moved to Watertown, New York, sometime after that, but before 1901.

Career before becoming a lawyer 
In June 1901, Kerr moved from Watertown, New York, to Denver to accept an executive and governance position — corporate secretary and director — with The New York Mining and Development Company, of which Ezekiel Hanson Cook, PhD (1845–1907), who from 1994 to 1889 had been the president of Potsdam Normal College, was president.  Charles Finding was the Vice President and Charles Love was the Treasurer.  The same group of executives simultaneously ran another Denver-based mining company called Mountain Pride Mining Co.

Selected songs 

 (publisher unknown)
 "Listen to the Rain," lyrics by Kerr, music by Henry Joseph Tandler (1881–1940)
 "Send Back Dear Daddy To Me," lyrics by Kerr, music by Irving Maslof
 "Sweetheart Days," lyrics by Kerr, music by Homer Tourjée (1866–1943) (1920)
 "Don't Make Your Sweet Mama Cry Over You," lyrics by Kerr, music by Earl Burtnett, arranged by Vern Elliott (1922)
 "If I Had a Little Girl Like You," lyrics by Kerr, music by Otto Milton Heinzman (1873–1943) (1935)
 "Just You, Dear," lyrics by Kerr, music by Otto Milton Heinzman (1873–1943) (1935)
 "I'd Love to Know," lyrics by Kerr, music by Otto Motzan (1880–1937) (1920) 
 "If All The Years Were Mine," lyrics by Kerr, music by Henry Joseph Tandler (1881–1940) (1920) 
 "There's No Other Rose Like You," lyrics by Kerr, music by William Alexander 
 "My Rosebud Rosary," lyrics by Hal Billings (pseudonym of Kerr), music by Charlie Straight & Roy Bargy, arranged by Otto Frey (1921)
 "When Love's the Gondolier," lyrics by Hal Billings (pseudonym of Kerr), music by Henry R. Cohen (1922) 
 "I Can't Forgive and Forget," lyrics by Hal Billings (pseudonym of Kerr), music by Joseph Meyer (1923)
 "Pep," (aka "Yankee Pep") lyrics by Kerr, music by Elizabeth D. Armer, arranged by Homer Tourjée (1866–1943) (1919)
 "If Solomon Had a Million Wives Today," lyrics and music by Kerr (manuscript)
 "My Heart is the Harbor to Hold All Your Love," lyrics and music by Kerr (manuscript)
 "That's Where I Love You the Most," lyrics and music by Kerr (manuscript)
 "When Your Love Crept Into My Heart," lyrics by Kerr, music by William (Billy) D. Alexander (1919)

 Windsor Music Co, Chicago, New York
 "Waiting," lyrics & music by Kerr (1902) 
 "Dorothy Waltzes," lyrics & music by Kerr (1903) 
 "Elinore Waltzes," lyrics & music by Kerr (1904) 

 Willis Woodward & Co., New York
 "May I Call on You?," lyrics by Kerr, music by Henry Arthur Blumenthal (1906) 

 The Mammoth Music Company, Albany, New York
 "Put Your Shoes in My Trunk," lyrics by Kerr, music by Henry P. Vogel (1906) 
 "When Daddy Sings the Little Ones to Sleep," lyrics by Kerr, music by Henry P. Vogel
 "Don't Say Good Bye, Sweet Elinore," lyrics by Kerr, music by Henry P. Vogel (1906)
 "Blue Eyed Mary," lyrics by Kerr, music by Henry P. Vogel

 Roger A. Graham, Providence
 All I heard was 'Dance me round again, Bill,' lyrics by Kerr, music by William C. Lindemann (1909); 
 Love Is Only A Dream, lyrics by Kerr, music by William C. Lindemann (1909); 

 Metropolis Music Co.
 "Lull Me To Sleep, That Slumber Melody," lyrics by Kerr, music by Ted S. Barron (née Theodore S. Barron; 1879–1943) (1914) 
 "My Rosy Love Dreams of You," lyrics by Kerr, music by Ted S. Barron (1879–1943) (1914)

 M. Witmark & Sons
 "Drifting Down the Old St. Lawrence," lyrics & music by Kerr (1900) 
 "The Ebony-Colored Club; Ethiopian Two-Step," lyrics & music by Kerr (1901) 
 "Where Love Alone is King," lyrics by Kerr, music by Ernest R. Ball (1907) 
 "In a Little Wigwam," lyrics & music by Kerr (1908) 
 "Father Has a Tender Heart," lyrics & music by Kerr (1908) 
 "I'm Just a Ragged Newsboy, But My Heart's True Blue," lyrics & music by Kerr (1908) 
 "There's a Sunny Smile Waiting For Me," lyrics by Kerr, music by Leo Edwards (1930) 

 Jerome H. Remick & Co., Detroit, New York
 "Won't You Share a Little Home With Me?" lyrics & music by Kerr (1908) 
 "Tell Me the Story of Love," lyrics by Kerr, music by C Sharpe Minor (Charles Sharpe Minor; died 1957) (1920) 
 "Some Day the Long Way Will Turn," lyrics by Kerr, music by Henry Joseph Tandler (1881–1940) (1920) 
 "Years," lyrics by Kerr, music by Otto Motzan (1880–1937) (1920)
 "Just Keep a Thought For Me," lyrics by Kerr, music by Earl Burtnett & Max Fischer, arr. by J. Bodewalt Lampe (1921) 
 "Two Tiny Hands," lyrics by Kerr, Henry Joseph Tandler (1881–1940) (1920)
 "Manzanilla" (tango), lyrics by Hal Billings (pseudonym of Kerr), music Henry Joseph Tandler (1881–1940) (1923) 
 "Counting the Days," lyrics by Kerr, music by Earl Burtnett & Jess Kirkpatrick (1924) 
 "Guessing," lyrics by Kerr, music by Henry R. Cohen, cover artist William Austin Starmer (1925)

 Leo Feist, Inc.
 "Just Tell Me You Are Mine," lyrics by Kerr, music by Ted S. Barron (née Theodore S. Barron; 1879–1943) (1905) 
 "Get on the Raft With Taft," lyrics by Kerr, music by Abe Holzmann (1908)  (President Taft weighed 300 lbs.)
 "Blue Moon," lyrics by Kerr, music by Earl Burtnett & Louis Marcasie (1921) 
 "Keep All Your Love For Me," lyrics by Kerr, music by Otto Motzan (1880–1937), arranged by Arthur Lange (1919)
 French Version: "Tout ton amour pour moi," French text by A. Bollaert
 "Whenever I Think of You," lyrics by Kerr, music by Henry Joseph Tandler (1881–1940) (1929); 

 Victor Kremer Co, Chicago
 "While You are Mine," lyrics by Kerr, music by W G Powell (1907) 
 "While Love and Life Shall Last," lyrics & music by Kerr (1909) 

 Miller Music Publishing Co., Chicago
 "Ride Me in a Big Balloon," lyrics and music by Kerr (1910) 
 "When You Marry a Girl For Looks," lyrics & music by Kerr (1910) 
 "Your Love is My Guiding Star," lyrics & music by Kerr (1910) 
 "Playin' Honeymoon," lyrics & music by Kerr (1910) 

 Vinton Pub. Co., Boston
 "Sweetest Mem'ries of Courting Days," lyrics and music by Kerr (1911) 
 "I'd Love to Have You Love Me: (as I Love You)," lyrics & music by Kerr (1911) 

 Joe Morris Music Co., New York
 "We're Ready for Teddy Again," lyrics by Kerr, music by Alfred Solman (1912) 

 Church, Paxson and Co., New York
 "My Rose in a World of Tears," lyrics by Kerr, music by Jerome Heller (1912) 
 "Down Deep in a Submarine," lyrics & music by Kerr (1915) 

 G. Schirmer
 "Wonderful Love of My Dreams," lyrics by Kerr, music by Henry Joseph Tandler (1881–1940) (1919) 

 C. C. Church & Co., Hartford
 "My Yukon Rose," lyrics by Kerr, music by William D Alexander (1920) 

 New Amsterdam Music Corporation, New York
 "I'm an American, That's All," lyrics by Kerr, music by Johann C. Schmid (1870–1951) (1915) 

 Gillick Co., San Francisco
 "When Lola Pedals on the Pianola" (1917) 
 "You've Certainly Opened My Eyes," (1917) 
 "When My Alimony Ship Comes In," lyrics & music by Kerr (1917) 

 Joseph W. Stern & Co.
 "She's a Rose in the World of Smiles and Tears," lyrics by Kerr, music by Alfred Baldwin Sloane (1905) 
 "I've Had Many a Sweetheart But None Like You," lyrics & music by Kerr (1907) 
 "Make Me a Boy Again Just for Tonight," by music & lyrics by Kerr (1917) 

 Chas. E. Roat Music Co., Battle Creek, Michigan
 "Your Heart is in the Rose," lyrics & music by Kerr (1917) 

 Edward L. Ballenger Music Publishing Co., Los Angeles
 "You Can Always Come Back to Me," lyrics & music by Kerr (1917)
 "In My Garden of Eden," lyrics & music by Kerr  (1917)
 "In A Rosy Cosy Arbor (There's A Harbor For Our Love)," lyrics & music by Kerr (1918)
 "That's Why Heaven Sent Me You," lyrics & music by Kerr (1918)

 Shapiro, Bernstein & Co.
 "Uncle Sammy, Keep the Family Cellar Full," by Kerr; Anna Chandler, Dave Dreyer (1917) 
 "Yokohama Love," lyrics by Kerr, music by Billy Alexander (1919) 
 "Sweet Little Bon-Bon," lyrics by Kerr, music by Sid Grauman (1921) 

 Pace & Handy Music Co., Memphis
 "The Song the Sunny Southland Sings," lyrics & music by Kerr (1917) 

 ArtMusic, Inc., New York (Will Von Tilzer; né William Gumm; 1882–1952)
 "Two Big Brown Eyes," lyrics by Kerr, music by Otto Motzan (1880–1937) (1918) 
 "Love Is Like a Precious Pearl," lyrics by Kerr, music by Otto Motzan (1880–1937) (1919) 

 Broadway Music Corporation (Will Von Tilzer; 1882–1952)
 "Down by the Millside Alongside the Hillside," lyrics by Lew Brown, music by Kerr (1919) 

 Los Angeles Music Publishing Co.
 "Dinah Lee," lyrics by Kerr, music by George J. Hayes (1919) 
 "Gypsy rose," lyrics by Kerr, music by Constance Loeser (1919)

 T. Presser, Philadelphia
 "Only to Live In Your Heart," lyrics by Kerr, music by James Francis Cooke (1919) 
 "My Dream of Paradise Came True," lyrics by Kerr, music by Homer Tourjée (1866–1943) (1919) 

 F.B. Haviland Pub. Co. (Frederick Benjamin Haviland; 1867–1932)
 "While the Stars in the Heavens Shine," lyrics by Kerr, music by Henry W. Petrie (1941) 
 "Comrade O' Mine," lyrics by Kerr, music by Elizabeth Thomas (1919)

 C. Arthur Fifer Music Co., Quincy, Illinois (Charles Arthur Fifer; 1884–1950)
 "Sailing Down Manila Bay," lyrics by Kerr, music by C. Arthur Fifer (1919)
 "When You're Lonely, So Lonely, Just Drifting," lyrics by Kerr, music by C. Arthur Fifer (1919) 
 "Wonderlove," lyrics by Kerr, music by Henry Joseph Tandler (1881–1940) (1919) 
 "I've Got a Little Home in the Country," lyrics by Kerr, music by C. Arthur Fifer (1919) 

 L.F. Collin, Melbourne (distributor for C. Arthur Fifer Music Co.)
 "Happy Days," lyrics by Kerr, music by C Arthur Fifer (1919) 
 "Just For a Place In Your Heart," lyrics & music by Kerr 

 Wright Music, Seattle
 "When Love and the World are in Tune," lyrics by Kerr, music by William D. Alexander; Harry D Kerr (1919) 

 A.J. Stasny Music Co.
 "If Tears Could Tell You All," lyrics by Kerr, music by Evans Lloyd (1920) 

 J.W. Jenkin's Sons Music, Kansas City, Missouri
 "Colleen O'Mine," lyrics by Kerr, music by Gerald McDonald (1920) 
 "Manila Memories," lyrics by Kerr, music by Leo F. Forbstein (1921) 

 Maurice Richmond (1880–1965), New York
 "Tenderly" (fox-trot) lyrics by Kerr, music by George A Little, Jack Stanley, & Harold A Dellon; orchestrated by Mornay D Helm (1921) 
 (aka "Share Your Heart" & "Will You Share Your Heart With Me?")
 "Somebody's Heart Is So Lonely," lyrics by Kerr, music by Otto Motzan (1880–1937) (1919)

 Nacio Herb Brown, Los Angeles
 "Love To Think of You," lyrics by Kerr, music by Nacio Herb Brown & Gene Rose (1922)
 "Heathen Lullaby," lyrics by Kerr, music by Nacio Herb Brown (1922)
 "Persian Nights," lyrics by Kerr, music by Nacio Herb Brown, arranged by Vern Elliott (1922)
 "The Sneak," lyrics by Kerr, music by Nacio Herb Brown, arranged by Vern Elliott (1922)

 Chappell & Co., Ltd., London
 "Kind Words," lyrics by Randal Moreland (pseudonym of Kerr), music by Lou Traveller (1922) 

 Allan & Co., Melbourne
 "Who Loves You Most of All?," lyrics by Hal Billings (pseudonym of Kerr), music by Henry R. Cohen (1922) 

 J Mills, New York
 "Love is Just a Flower," lyrics by Hal Billings (pseudonym of Kerr), music by Chris Schonberg & Abe Lyman (1923) 

 Waterson, Berlin & Snyder, Inc.
 "Little Thoughts" (fox-trot), lyrics by Hal Billings (pseudonym of Kerr), music by Charley Straight & Roy Bargy; arranged by Arthur Lange (1922) 
 "G'wan With It," lyrics by Kerr, music by Art Hickman & Earl Burtnett (1924) 

 Sam Fox Publishing Company
 "Jealous Moon," lyrics by Kerr, music by John Stepan Zamecnik (1918) 
 "Me-ow," lyrics by Kerr, music by Mel B. Kaufman (1919) 
 "Kisses," lyrics by Kerr, music by John Stepan Zamecnik (1919) 
 "Your Heart," lyrics by Kerr, music by John Stepan Zamecnik (1919)
 "Taxi," lyrics by Kerr, music by Mel B. Kaufman (1919) 
 "Love Me," lyrics by Kerr, music by J.S. Zamecnik (1919) 
 "My Cairo Love" (an Egyptian serenade), lyrics by Kerr, music by J S Zamecnik (1919) 
 "One Sweet Day," lyrics by Kerr, music by J S Zamecnik (1919) 
 "Dear Old Dixie Moon," lyrics by Kerr, music by George J. Hayes (1920) 
 "Blue Jeans," lyrics by Kerr, music by Lou Traveller (1920) 
 "Amorita," (Spanish fox-trot), lyrics by Kerr, music by J S Zamecnik (1920) 
 "Chu-Chu-San" (Japanese fox-trot), lyrics by Kerr, music by Joseph Samuels (1920) 
 "Stop it!" (one-step song), lyrics by Kerr, music by Mel B. Kaufman (1920) 
 "Biddy," lyrics by Kerr, music by J.S. Zamecnik (1920) 
 "Wonderland of Dreams," lyrics by Kerr, music by L W Abbott (pseudonym of Pietro Floridio) (1921) 
 "Somewhere in Naples," lyrics by Kerr, music by J S Zamecnik (1921) 
 "What the Little Stars Tell," lyrics by Kerr, music by J S Zamecnik (1921) 
 "Roaming Away From Me," lyrics by Kerr, music by Eddie Janis & Chris Schonberg (1921) 
 "Hurdy-Gurdy Blues," (fox-trot), lyrics by Kerr, music by Gene Scott, arranged by J S Zamecnik (1923) 
 "Neapolitan Nights," lyrics by Kerr, music by John Stepan Zamecnik (1925) 
 "Broken Dreams," lyrics by Kerr, music by Maurice Spitalny (1927) 
 "My Heaven Is Home" (fox-trot), lyrics by Kerr, music by Errol Collins, symphonic orchestration by Joseph Nussbaum (1928) 
 "Paradise," lyrics by Kerr, music by J S Zamecnik, film score by May Singhi Breen (1928) (theme song of the 1928 film, The Wedding March) 
 "Your Love Is All," lyrics by Kerr, music by J S Zamecnik, arranged by May Singhi Breen (as sung in the 1929 film Alibi) (1927) 
 "Venetia" (with violin & cello obbligato), lyrics by Kerr, music by J S Zamecnik (1930) 
 "Southern Moon," lyrics by Kerr, music by J S Zamecnik (1931) 
 "Adios My Senorita" (fox trot in In A♭ major), lyrics by Kerr, music by J S Zamecnik, arranged for band by Floyd J St Clair (1931) 

 Henry Burr Music Corporation, New York
 "Baby Curls," lyrics by Kerr, music by John Cooper (1921) 

 Forster Music Publisher, Inc., Inc., Chicago
 "Mem'ries of Love and You," lyrics by Kerr, music by Geoffrey O'Hara (1925) 

 Sherman, Clay & Co., San Francisco
 "Do You Ever Think of Me?" lyrics by Kerr & John Cooper, music by Earl Burtnett (1920) 
 "My Dearest Prayer," lyrics by Kerr, music by Henry Joseph Tandler (1881–1940) (1920) 
 "Somebody's Waiting," lyrics by Kerr, music by Chris Schonberg (1920) 
 "Have You Forgotten?" lyrics by Kerr, music by Earl Burtnett, John Cooper & Oswald Stevenson (1921) 
 "You Won't Be Sorry" (fox-trot), lyrics by Kerr, music by Earl Burtnett & Louis Marcasie, arranged by Harry A. Powell (1922) 
 "Don't Be Too Sure," lyrics by Hal Billings (pseudonym of Kerr), music by Henry R. Cohen (1922) 
 "Bygones," lyrics by Kerr, music by Irving Abrahamson & Don Warner (1924) 
 "That's My Girl," lyrics by Kerr, music by Joe McKiernan (1924) 
 "Ships That Pass In the Night," music by W. H. Smith & Earl Burtnett (1925)
 "Rest In My Arms," lyrics by Kerr, music by Earl Burtnett (1925) 
 "Give Me Today," lyrics by Kerr, music Paul Titsworth & Harold Bell (1926) 

 J. Albert & Son, Sydney
 "Oriental Love Dreams," lyrics by Kerr, music by Earl Burtnett & Henry Miller, cover artist POM Griffith (né Porter Murdock Griffith; 1889–1969) (1924) 
 "Croon a Little Lullaby," lyrics by Kerr, music by Chris Schonberg & Clyde Baker (1925) 

 DeSylva, Brown and Henderson Inc., New York — selling agents – Crawford Music Corp.
 "Guns," lyrics by Kerr, music by Geoffrey O'Hara (1928) 

 Suttons, Melbourne
 "Redskin," lyrics by Kerr, music by J S Zamecnik (1929)  (theme song of the Paramount picture Redskin)

 R.L. Huntzinger, New York
 "My Home is a Trailer," lyrics by Kerr, music by Geoffrey O'Hara (1938) 

 William Conrad Polla (1876–1939)
 "When You are Near," (song, Op. 4, No. 3), lyrics by Kerr (1939)
 "Shepherd's Call," (song, Op. 4, No. 5), lyrics by Kerr (1939)
 "Shadows of Evening," (song, Op. 4, No. 7), lyrics by Kerr (1939)

 Boston Music
 "A Real Low Down Basso Am I," lyrics by Kerr, music by Geoffrey O'Hara (1948) 

 State Theatre Collection, Sydney, Australia (for cinema use)
 "Love Bound," lyrics by Kerr, music by Carl Rupp (1926)

Selected recordings

Record labels 

 Blue Amberol Records
 1922 — Wonderland of Dreams 

 Nordskog Records
 1922 — Who Loves You Most After All? Harry Baisden and his Bon Ton Orchestra Nordskog 3023B

 Brunswick Records
 1924 — Bygones 
 19?? — Bygones 
 1924 — Oriental Love Dreams 
 19?? — Oriental Love Dreams 
 1924 — That's My Girl 
 19?? — Rest in My Arms 
 1926 — Memories of Love and You 
 19?? — Ships that Pass in the Night
 19?? — In the Heart of the Hills
 1924 — Go Your Way and I'll Go Mine 
 1925 — Croon a Little Lullaby 
 19?? — Croon a Little Lullaby 
 1921 —  
 19?? — Do You Ever Think Of Me? 
 19?? — Do You Ever Think Of Me? 
 19?? — Give Me Today, 
 19?? — Neapolitan Nights, 
 19?? — Neapolitan Nights, 
 19?? — You Won't Be Sorry 
 1922 — Love Dove 
 1924 — My Beautiful Mexican Rose 
 19?? — Monte Carlo Moon 
 1924 — Monte Carlo Moon
 1929 — Redskin
 1937 — Rose Room 
 1937 — The Morning After 

 Victor
 1909 — B-7014: In a Little Wigwam, Harvey W. Hindermeyer with orchestra
 1917 — B-19876: That's Why My Heart is Calling You, Charles Hart with orchestra
 1917 — B-19878: That's Why My Heart is Calling You, Emilio de Gogorza with orchestra
 1921 — B-24785: Blue Jeans, Peerless Quartet with orchestra
 1922 — B-26415: Wonderland of Dreams, Elsie Baker, Olive Kline (duet) with orchestra
 1924 — B-29518: Counting the Days, male vocal with the International Novelty Orchestra
 1924 — B-29839: Oriental Love Dreams, vocal duet with the Coon-Sanders Original Nighthawk Orchestra
 1925 — BVE-33308: Croon a Little Lullaby, male vocal duet with the International Novelty Orchestra
 1928 — BVE-45681: Neapolitan Nights, male vocal with The Troubadours
 1928 — BVE-47507: Paradise, Fred Waring and The Pennsylvanians
 1929 — BVE-49921: Redskin, Helen Clark with orchestra
 1920 — [Trial 1920-02-09-02]: Was There Ever a Pal Like You?, George Wilton Ballard with piano
 1928 — [Trial 1928-01-23-01]: Out of the Dusk to You, Dan Gridley with piano

Song titles 

 "Neapolitan Nights" ("Oh, Nights of Splendor")
 19??: Don Clark and His La Monica Ballroom Orchestra 
 1926: Harry Reser's Casino Dance Orchestra (instrumental)
 1928: James Melton (theme song from the synchronized film Fazil)
 1928: Kjerulf's Mayfair Quintette (feat. in the short film A Musical Melange)
 1928: Jack Denny & His Orch. (instrumental)
 1929: The Four Synco-Pets (featured in the short film Musical Moments)
 1934: Enrico Caruso Jr. - (featured in the film El cantante de Nápoles)
 1938: Carlos Sanatana's Accordion Band (vocal: Webster Booth)
 1948: Jo Stafford & Gordon MacRae 
 1949: Mario Lanza 
 1954: Ferrante & Teicher (instrumental)
 1954: Frankie Yankovic  
 1955: Michel Legrand 
 1958: Robert Alda  
 1962: Willis "Gator" Jackson (instrumental)

Filmography 

 Boardwalk Empire (2010 TV series)
 Hold Me in Paradise (2010 film) — "Do You Ever Think Of Me?" (uncredited)
 Bugs Bunny's Easter Special (1977 TV special) — "Me-ow" (uncredited)
 The Lawrence Welk Show (TV series)
 Episode 8.46 (1963) — "Neapolitan Nights" (uncredited)
 Tweety's Circus (1955 short) — "Me-ow" (uncredited)
 That's the Spirit (1945) — "Do You Ever Think of Me?"
 You're Next to Closing (1939 short) — "Neapolitan Nights" (uncredited)
 The Lady in Red (1935 short) — "Neapolitan Nights" (uncredited)
 El cantante de Nápoles (1935 film) — "Neapolitan Nights" (uncredited)
 Alibi (1929 film) — "Your Love Is All" (uncredited)
 Whispering Winds (1929 film) — "Whenever I Think of You" (theme song), "Listen to the Rain"
 One Stolen Night (1929 film) — "My Cairo Love" (uncredited)
 A Musicale Melange (1929 short) — "Neapolitan Nights" (uncredited)
 Musical Moments (1929 short) — "Neapolitan Nights" (uncredited, performed by The Four Synco-Pets)
 The Wedding March (1928 film) —  "Paradise" (the love theme)
 Frazil (1928 film) — "Neapolitan Nights" (uncredited)
 Redskin (1929 film) —  (uncredited)

Screenplays 

 Boston Blackie (TV series)
The Motorcycle Kid (1953) (original story)
 Cheaters (1927 film) (story)

Radio theme music 

 The First Nighter Program — Neapolitan Nights

Pseudonyms 
 Randal Moreland
 Hal Billings

Progressive sociological essays by Kerr 
 The Farce of Jury By Trial, The International: A Review of Two Worlds (journal), edited by George Sylvester Viereck, The Moods Publishing Company, Volumes 8, No. III, March 1914, pg. 98 
 Does Drunkenness Follow Prohibition? Overland Monthly, October 1916, pps. 341–347
 Prison Reform, The New Age Magazine, Scottish Rite (publisher), New York, February 1913, pps. 121–130
 If the People Could Own What They Use, The Oriental Economic Review, Vol. 3, No. VII & VIII, May–June 1913, pps. 527–535
 Price Maintenance — The Salvation of Business
 Copyright Legislation — An Answer to the Argument of the Manufacturers of Phonographs and Other Mechanical Reproduction Devices (1908)

Family 

Kerr was married twice.

His first marriage was to Harriet Lodge Hastings (maiden; 1883–1946).  They married on October 9, 1905, in Albany, New York.  His second marriage was to Ruth Eleanor Minter (maiden; 1892–1969).  They married on December 20, 1919, in Santa Ana, California, and remained married until his death.

References 
 General references

 Library of Congress
 Biography of Song Sheets; Sports and Recreations in American Popular Songs: Part IV — Songs of the Silent Film, compiled by Gerald D. McDonald, Notes (journal), Second Series, Vol. 14, No. 4, September 1957

 Inline citations

External links

1880 births
1957 deaths
American lyricists
Songwriters from California
Albany Law School alumni
People from Watertown, New York
People from Gouverneur, New York
Musicians from Los Angeles
Lawyers from Los Angeles
Songwriters from New York (state)
Burials at Forest Lawn Memorial Park (Glendale)
20th-century American lawyers